Lannemezan (Gascon Occitan Lanamesa, "heath of the middle") is a commune in the Hautes-Pyrénées department and the Occitanie region in south-western France. The inhabitants are called Lannemezanais.

Geography
The Petite Baïse has its source in the commune.

Geology and relief
Over 50 million years, driven by movements of compression, low relief which constitutes the Pre-Pyrenees has risen. Glaciers and streams that cascade down its slopes subject to mountain erosion which flows off from the foot of it. High up and submitted to the four winds, the site already assigns itself an identity that would assist in its history and reputation.

The soil is composed of uncultivated and barren land, dotted with woodlands, coppicing, cut of marshes and heath. Peat moor is exploited near La Barthe-de-Neste. Analysis of the soil in the commune of Lannemezan shows the results presented in the following table.

The top of the foothills face the Pyrenean part of the Neste Valley, the river which then turns east at the foot of the plateau. Other rivers (Gers, Baïse, etc.), flow radially from this point to the northwest, north and northeast, and the altitude of the plateau decreases gradually. On the south side, this plateau is still connected to the Pyrenean massif by a narrow tongue of land between Izaux and Avezac. Otherwise, it ends to the southwest and the southeast by a steep overhang and residual hills (Capvern, Mauvezin, etc.) facing the Pyrenees.

Natural vegetation

The natural vegetation of Lannemezan and its small region is characterised by a heathland landscape, although moisture of soils is highly variable depending on their location (particularly in relation to their proximity to water courses).

Thus, in wet areas near the rivers extend many bogs characterised by dwarf gorse (Ulex minor), St. John's wort (Hypericum elodes L.) marshes or wet meadows which extend Medusa's trumpets (Narcissus bulbocodium L.), of oatgrass (Arrhenatherum longifolium) or alder (Alnus).

In drier areas grow more woody species such as Pyrenean oak, also known under the name of tauzin oak (Quercus pyrenaica), as well as pedunculated oak (Quercus robur) or chestnut (Castanea sativa Mill).

In all cases, the soils are rather acidic type with adjustable humidity, which imposes certain constraints for the development of plant species. These development constraints are represented on the adjoining humidity/acidity chart.

Hydrography
Eighteen rivers have their sources on the Plateau de Lannemezan or pass through the territory of the commune. The main are listed in the following table.

Natural risks and disasters
The commune is placed under supervision in relation to some possible natural and technological hazards:

Flood
Industrial risk
Earthquake: Zone of seismicity 1B
Transport of dangerous goods

Recent natural disasters on the commune are as follows, since 1980 (from most recent to oldest):

Location

General location:

Lannemezan is a bastide situated in the centre of the Plateau de Lannemezan between Tarbes and Toulouse on the Petite Baïse. Between the Atlantic and Mediterranean, at the outlet of the valleys of the Pyrenees, Lannemezan imposes itself as a privileged strategic its geographical position city.

Bordering communes

Spatially, Lannemezan is wedged between the following nine communes: Campistrous to the northwest, Clarens in the northeast, Capvern to the west, Uglas and Pinas to the east, Avezac-Prat-Lahitte in the southwest, La Barthe-de-Neste and Escala to the south, and Cantaous to the southeast.

Distance to some large French cities
The orientation and location of Lannemezan, compared to some large French cities, is given in the following table (distances are given as the fastest route by road):

Area

Altitude

Changes in altitude are important on the territory of the commune.

Climate

Tarbes-Ossun weather station 'normals' reveal a rather cool climate, rainy in winter and hot and stormy in summer. The average annual temperature  is relatively low for such latitude, with a fairly low seasonal amplitude,  on average during the winter and  during the summer. These high temperatures are typical of the foehn wind, due to the relief of the Pyrenees.

In Tarbes, fog and strong winds are rare. These climate characteristics of Tarbes are found in the north of the department, but with more fog in winter, and warmer daytime temperatures and lower precipitation in the summer. Conversely on the closer terrain the average quantities of precipitation increase. This varies greatly depending on exposure and slopes, but become abundant near the border ridges. The area between plain and mountain has a more humid climate and less sunny than the rest of the department. In the mountains the sun shines frequently above a sea of clouds and the wind blows stronger and more often than on the plain (breezes and sometimes very strong winds from the south).

The  is characterised by a rainy and cool springtime, especially snowy at altitude; weather from the northwest is blocked by the relief and a phenomenon of precipitation at altitude has the consequence of strong accumulations of snow at altitude until mid-May. Summer is mild but stormy, autumn is generally sunny and pleasant, usually followed by a relatively mild winter on the plains and cold above .

Records of temperatures and precipitation are collected in the following table:

Sunshine and rainfall (since 1999)

Sunshine and precipitation values are visible in the following table:

Extreme temperatures and precipitation records (since 1999)

Records of temperatures and precipitation amounts, between 1999 and 2011, are listed in the following table:

Lannemezan climate according to the Köppen classification

According to the Köppen classification, the town of Lannemezan is located in the "Cfb" category:

The C (1st letter) expresses the climate: A temperate climate:

Average temperature of the hottest month above  ( in Lannemezan)
The seasons of summer and winter are well defined

The f (2nd letter) expresses the rainfall:

Humid climate
Precipitation every month of the year
No dry season

The b (3rd letter) expresses the temperature variations: been temperate:

Average temperatures of the four hottest months above  ( in Lannemezan)

Channels of communication

Road Network

Lannemezan is a town in transition, served by many roads. The majority of these are in the north/south and east/west directions. Here are the details:

Rail network

Lannemezan is located on the Toulouse-Bayonne line. The SNCF Gare de Lannemezan is situated on Avenue de la Gare, and is on the line from Toulouse to Bayonne,  from the city centre. The previous station is that of Montréjeau-Gourdan-Polignan coming from Toulouse, the next station is that of Capvern. Another line ran from Lannemezan to Arreau-Cadéac station, but it is no longer in service. The different types of train currently serving Lannemezan station are:

A proposed central crossing of the Pyrenees, linking Toulouse to Zaragoza, is currently under development. This line would use the current Toulouse/Bayonne route, as far as Lannemezan. Lannemezan station would be a railway junction, from which a new line would join Spain, through a tunnel dug in the Aure Valley (at Hèches). This new line would bring relief to the other two traditional routes (by Hendaye in the Basque country and Cerbère on the border with Catalonia), while reducing the isolation of the central Pyrenees and the Aran Valley in Spain.

Airports
Three international airports are located within  of Lannemezan:

Tarbes–Lourdes–Pyrénées Airport (TLP), 
Pau Pyrénées Airport, 
Toulouse–Blagnac Airport,

Urbanism

Urban morphology

The town of Lannemezan has a general north/south orientation, and consists of the following main areas:

Le centre-ville: built around the town hall and the Saint Jean Baptiste Church, the town centre is the historic heart of the town and was renovated in the last decade. Thus, the new Place des Droits de l'Homme et du Citoyen [Square of Human Rights and the Citizen] with the Tourist Office and which faces a recent bandstand which is the place of entertainments and events of the town. Rue Thiers, the central street, is the most commercial of the commune and the entrance to the Paul Bert shopping mall, where the Salle du Renouveau du Plateau [Room of the Renewal of the Plateau] is situated. Likewise, the Place de la Poste, a recently renovated square, allows a pleasant rest thanks to its two fountains and its flower beds.
Las Moulias, les Bans and Piquegrue: To the north, the Moulins quarter (or las moulias) around the cité des bans, of the college, is changing thanks to the construction of new subdivisions and a health centre.
Les Bourtoulets, la Galavette and l'Hippodrome: Around the Boulevard des Tilleuls and near the SNCF railway station, the quarter is located higher than the town centre and is spread around a large boulevard which is pleasant for walks.
It largely consists of detached houses along many green areas ensuring calm for their inhabitants.
La Demi-Lune: Away from the city, this neighborhood is built around the Demi-Lune leisure park, bordering the Canal de la Neste, the golf course and the hospital complex of Lannemezan.

Housing

The statistics for housing in the town are grouped in the following table:

Public transport

A shuttle was set up two days a week (Wednesday and Friday), with special access for seniors. Three services are available with stops on the following roads:

Development projects

New subdivisions
Very many real estate projects have been launched in the city, to improve habitation in Lannemezan, as well as to increase the housing capacity, to limit the effect of the Lannemezan population decrease.

Among these, the Clos des Moulins, delivered in 2007, presents 44 units spread across four-storey buildings, close to the college and the stadium. Always close to the college, the cité des familles consists of 16 moderate-rent housing. In 2008, two other residences were opened near the Des Bourtoulets Quarter, Boulevard des Tilleuls and the station: The Villalodge du Parc, consisting of 16 villas and 54 apartments, and the residence of la Cheneraie, consisting of 62 apartments spread over four-storey buildings. Finally, north of the town, on the road to Galan, the Bastide de Piquegrue was created in 2009. It contains 34 semi-detached villas.

City centre and the Place du Château
At the level of the rehabilitation of the city centre, the majority of the streets and squares have been remade for nine to 15 years. A renovation project of the façades, in association with the mayor's office, has been organized. Lastly, the construction of buildings in the Place du Château, scheduled for 2010, will be used to completely close the place to give it a more urban character.

The CM10 conversion
On this land, three areas will be delineated: The first zone of trade and crafts, the second will be used for the construction of a tertiary residence and finally the last area will be a space of inter-communal development.

Toponymy
Located halfway between the Atlantic and the Mediterranean, it is based on the Plateau de Lannemezan, the Gascon Occitan word Lanamesa: The "heath of the middle". Lannemezan is also made up of the lande de Boc (lande du bouc), former den of witches and bandouliers (highwaymen) which gradually declined as a result of the hard work of men, both agricultural and industrial.

History

The Middle Ages
Géraud of Aure-Larboust, the lord who ruled on the Plateau de Lannemezan, founded the fortified village of Lennemezan in the Lande de Boc in 1274, probably on the site of an earlier watchtower. To populate the place, he granted a charter franchise.

In 1345, Gaston III of Foix-Béarn bought Lannemezan from Géraud II of Aure-Larboust for price of 1,700 livres tournois and attaches the village to the Viscount of Nébouzan. In 1388, the chronicler Jean Froissart passes by "the Châtel of Lamesen".

Early Modern era
In 1500, Catherine of Navarre, heir of the property of Foix-Béarn, granted Lannemezan the right to hold a market every Wednesday, as well as a fair four times a year. In 1569, his granddaughter Jeanne d'Albret charged Gabriel I of Montgomery to regain the land confiscated by the King of France. At the head of a Protestant army of 3,000 men, Montgomery set upon taking the Pyrenean country. At Lannemezan, the St. John the Baptist Church and the houses of the priests were burned.

In 1607, Henri IV linked the Viscount of Nébouzan to the Kingdom of France and in 1630, the city had 130 feus.

During the Revolution, Lannemezan was attached to the department of the Hautes-Pyrénées. Its first mayor, Dominique Lagleize, was appointed in 1790. The last lord, Marc II Bertrand François de Lassus, was sentenced to death by the Revolutionary Court of Paris, and was sent to the guillotine in 1794.

19th century

Throughout the 19th century, Lannemezan acquired various pieces of infrastructure.

A fountain, since moved, was located opposite the town hall in 1848.

The grain market, a disappeared work by the architect Isidore Bonnemaison, was built to mark the centenary of the Revolution in 1889.

20th century and the beginning of the 21st century

The development of Lannemezan was accentuated in the 20th century. It became a real city with businesses and industries. However, farming remains active.

Impressive growth (1900–1970)

Emergence of the Peyrehitte Quarter
During World War I, a hydro electrochemical plant built by the Poudrerie Nationale de Toulouse settled in the Peyrehitte quarter. In 1921, it became the Société des Produits Azotés [nitrogen products company] (SPA). Within its development, the construction of another plant, a producer of aluminium (electro-chemistry), began in 1939. These two plants, although creating jobs, did not cause any significant increase in population (only 500 inhabitants more, between 1906 and 1936). Their workforce, in fact, consisted mainly of locals (who often kept their second job of farming) and foreigners. All the same, it required the construction of a workers' village that was equipped with a chapel, a dining room, a school and a swimming pool, etc. The quarter had a population of almost 600 people in 1943.

Vichy regime and internment camp
A decree of 6 April 1940, even before the German invasion, prohibited the movement of nomads (Gypsies, fairground, etc.) throughout the metropolitan territory for the duration of the war and imposed house arrest. In 1940, following the German invasion, anti-nomadic racism increased under the Vichy regime and the first "Gypsies" were interned in camps both in the occupied area and the free zone. Both camps would be created in the "free zone" in order to intern nomads: The Saliers camp and the camp of Lannemezan.

At Lannemezan, in April 1941, the prefect of the Hautes-Pyrénées brought together all of the "nomads" of the department on the Plateau de Lannemezan, then enclosed them in a ruined hospital which was guarded by the gendarmerie. The camp was located on a hillside and at the mercy of the elements, like the others it was ill-equipped and unsanitary. Approximately 700 people, which according to the definition of the vichy regime were called "Bohemians" (nomads, fairground people) were interned in the camps, they stayed there until 1946.

Metamorphosis of the Demi-Lune quarter
The psychiatric hospital was built just before World War II (1938), a barracks, as well as an arsenal (in 1939) in place of the former racecourse in the town. In 1945, it was entrusted to Dr. . Modern psychiatry, including by rehabilitation through work, made Lannemezan hospital a renowned place throughout the country.

Around it, the Demi-Lune quarter was organized and embellished with a leisure park which welcomed more than 100,000 visitors per year, as well as an 18-hole golf course.

The arsenal, after a period of abandonment, served as a deposit and place of storage from 1948. It expanded greatly during the 1950s, especially with a Mobilising Centre (CM 10) opening in 1951.

The mobile guards barracks became that of a Republican Company of Security (CRS 29) with an adjoining housing estate. The population of Lannemezan then rose to almost 9,000 inhabitants at the end of the 1960s.

Evolution of central public spaces
The beginning of the 20th century was marked by the burning of the town hall. The former town hall building was rebuilt in 1911 in a Neo-Renaissance style. The fountain which faced the old town hall, on the Place de la République, was dismantled. it was eventually reused to decorate the vicinity of the hospital.

The statue of the Druidess, installed in front of the grain market in 1911, moved on the Place de Foirail in 1926. It replaced the war memorial of Paul Ducuing which stands today on the Esplanade de la Poste. In 1943, it was melted down by the occupying German authorities, in order to recover metals.

During the war, many families from the north and east of the France took refuge in Lannemezan, allowing a doubling of the population. The factories had up to 1,200 employees. Many markets and fairs and thirty cafes made for a bustling city centre.

In 1967, the grain market was demolished to build the functionalist post office and its tree-lined esplanade.

The decline (1970–2007)
From the 1970s, the oil crisis and the austerity measures forced a decline in industry activity and the decline of the number of their employees. In addition, the reform of the armed forces involved the closure of the arsenal. Only the psychiatric hospital managed to remain, and doubled as a general hospital, an emergency department and maternity (closed in 2009 during the reform of hospitals).

The introduction of the new prison, in 1987, and the renovation of a very large part of the town centre did not prevent the decline of the population, which fell below 6,000 inhabitants at the beginning of the 21st century.

However, the redevelopment of the site of the Alcan plant, closed in 2007–2008, with the opening of the Carbone Savoie and Knauf Insulation factories, associated with many real estate projects (reconstruction of the cité des familles, new subdivisions, etc.) could mean the end of the decline.

Decorations, distinctions and titles
 Obtaining of the Croix de guerre 1939–1945.
The first town hall present on Second Life.
Part of the Saint-Jean-Baptiste Church is classified as an historical monument.
The T1 and T2 tumuli are also classified as historical monuments.

Politics and administration

Political trends and results
The results with the latest elections, since 2001, are presented in the table below:

Presidential Elections

Other elections

List of mayors

Since 1939, Lannemezan has had only four mayors:

Arrangement of the municipal council

The municipal election of 2008 took place in a single round. Four lists were present:

The outgoing mayor was Bernard Plano (PS-UG) who got 58.95% of the votes (i.e. 1710 of 2901)
Marie-Françoise Couput (DVD) who won 21.17% of the votes (614 votes)
Laurent Lages (DVG) who got 14.82% of the votes (430 votes)
Michel Duprat who got 5.07% of the votes (147 votes)

Below is the sharing of the seats in the municipal council of Lannemezan, following the municipal elections in 2008:

Judicial and administrative authorities
The city has a municipal police service, a police station and a courthouse which was closed as part of the Dati reform.

The , was built in 1987.

Agglomeration community

Twinning
Lannemezan is twinned with:

 Tondela, Portugal since 1995

Population and society

Demography

Demographic evolution
In 2017, the commune had 5,837 inhabitants, making it the most populous commune in the canton of La Vallée de la Barousse, the second most populous commune in the arrondissement of Bagnères-de-Bigorre and the fifth most populous commune in Hautes-Pyrénées.

Population distribution and age structure
The population of Lannemezan counts more women than men: 50.7% women. The age structure of the commune of Lannemezan in 2017 is shown below.

Education
Lannemezan is part of the Academy of Toulouse. All of the establishments in the town are summarised in the table below.

Nursery and primary schools
Since the closure of the Groupe Scolaire de la Demi-Lune at the beginning of the 21st century due to lack of staff, four school groups are present in the city.

Paul-Baratgin School Group, Rue des Écoles.
Las Moulias School Group, Cité des Bans.
Des Bourtoulets School Group, Boulevard des Tilleuls.
Guérissa School Group, Rue de la Lande Boc.

Secondary

College Gaston Fébus, 101 Rue de la Cité Scolaire. This is a boarding school and offers a general education and Segpa. Teaching languages: English, Spanish, Occitan and Latin. Sports sections: Rugby
Michelet general education lycée, Rue du Stade. Sections S, ES and L, the school has a boarding school and specialised sports sections: Ski and Snowboard. It offers other options such as ancient languages (Latin) and regional languages (Occitan) and the Spanish European section.

Website: ENT

Specialised education
Centre de formation professionnelle et de promotion agricole [Centre for vocational training and agricultural promotion] (FPAFC), Chemin du Bidalet, agricultural education.

University life
The town of Lannemezan lacks institutions for higher education. However, academic centres are present near the town: Tarbes, Auch, Pau and Toulouse.

There is also an important school of engineers, ENIT (National School of engineers of Tarbes which belongs to the INP in Toulouse: National Polytechnic Institute). This centre concentrates approximately 5,000 students.

Cultural events and festivities
Lannemezan is the main location of numerous festivals and events throughout the year.

The festival of Saint Jean
The festival of Saint Jean, taking place in late June for five days (from Friday to Tuesday) annually attracts many people, and allows the animation of the entire town, thanks to the many events offered. Fireworks, concerts in all corners of the town, disco entertainment or musette following into the evening, many rides for children or excitement for those bigger, with activities offered by different associations, such as horse races or the demonstration by the firefighters of the plateau. This annual festival is launched with the famous fire of Saint Jean, which takes place in a different area each year.

Markets

The weekly market takes place every Wednesday morning until early afternoon and attracts many merchants who sometimes come from very far away to Lannemezan. This market is located in the streets of the town centre, around the church and the Place du Château, as well as in the covered market hall with vegetables of the Nébouzan.

During the summer, night markets are organised by the town. These allow tourists and residents to discover local crafts and the many typical gastronomic specialties of the region.

The annual festival of theatre
Created in 2003 by the town hall, the inter-Pyrénéan meetings of theatre are the highlight of the Lannemezan cultural year. Initially scheduled in July, these meetings are, since 2006, held in September to better involve schools and the Lannemezan people returning from holiday.

Other events
The comedy festival.
Many fairs and flea markets are held throughout the year. Also, theatre, outdoor concerts and indoors, especially of the nationally recognised Harmonie municipale de Lannemezan.

Health
Central Hospital: This is one of the largest employers in the Hautes-Pyrénées department, which provides the following services:
Medicine, surgery and emergencies
Mental health (adult and child psychiatry)
Geriatric and elderly service
Medico-social, disability rehabilitation
A medical technology floor

The establishment, then called the Hôpital Psychiatrique de Lannemezan [Lannemezan Psychiatric Hospital] (HPL), was built in 1937 on the site of Lannemezan. Meanwhile, in 1975, a local clinic of the plateau, located in Lannemezan, was integrated to the hospital. The medical, surgical and emergency services were installed on the hospital site of Lannemezan in very modern premises built in 1991, referred to as the Medico-Surgical Centre.

Alcoholism centre: Les chemins de la lande, opened in 1999.
Radiology Centre: Situated in the Peyrehitte area.
Retirement home: Les Fougères, opened at the end of the 1990s.

Sport

Sports facilities

 (Rugby union, tennis, pelota, athletics), Rue du Stade. It consists of two fields, one with a grandstand (for the CAL) and surrounded by an athletics track, and another for training teams; four tennis courts; a fronton for the practice of Basque pelota and pala.
Bourtoulets Stadium (football), Boulevard des Tilleuls, with grandstand and two training stadia.
The Nébouzan sports complex (judo, aikido, basketball, gymnastics, pétanque, skateboarding), space of Nébouzan, Rue Montaigne. Consisting of a bowling space, a martial arts room with tatami mats, a room for gymnastics, a room with markings for basketball and a street park.
Municipal gymnasium (handball), Rue du 4 septembre
Municipal swimming pool (swimming, water aerobics), Rue des Moulins.
Equestrian centre and racecourse (horse riding), Route d'Auch.
Lannemezan Golf (golf), Rue du Dr H. Ueberschalag.

Sport in the town

Different sports in the town
Many sports can be practised in clubs in Lannemezan.

 Rugby union: CA Lannemezan, (Fédérale 1, 3rd division), several times champions of France: Fédérale 1 (2009), Fédérale 3 (2004), Nationale B (1997), Cadets (1975). Several club-trained players have had a national or international career as players or coaches.
 Football: Football-Club du Plateau (District)
 Handball: Pays des Nestes Handball (Prenational)
 Volleyball: Volleyball Lannemezanais
 Basketball: Lannemezan BasketèClub
 Judo: Judojo Lannemezan
 Karate: Lannemezan Karaté-Club
 Aikido: Dojo of the Plateau
 Cycling: Vélo-Club Lannemezan [Lannemezan Cycling Club], Union Cyclotouriste du Plateau
 Tennis: Tennis-Club of Lannemezan
 Badminton: Lannemezan badminton Club
 Table tennis: Lannemezan Tennis de Table
 Archery: Les Archers Bandouliers
 Basque pelota: Eskualduna

Organisation of sporting events
 
Lannemezan has, up to now, hosted a stage of the Tour de France four times. The town is due to do so again in 2015:

Lannemezan has also hosted the Tour des Pyrénées cycle race several times.

Media
Information bulletins, published by the commune, were created and sent to residents during the first term of office of the current PS mayor of the commune, Bernard Plano.

Radio Festival Lannemezan, a Lannemezan radio station also made its appearance, on 95FM Radio Festival. Radio Festival Lannemezan is under the supervision of the association of Festival D'Énergie du Plateau. The association which was aimed at the creation of a local radio station, was established in 2002. Radio Festival was initially a temporary radio. Since August 2006, it received the authority to operate a permanent radio. First installed on the premises of another radio (RDC) in the Comminges, after a few setbacks, it returned to Lannemezan and began broadcasting on 16 November 2007 with a brand new team of volunteers. The headquarters is still town hall of Lannemezan, with the studio on Rue Alphonse Couget and transmitter on the water tower of the CM 10. This enables coverage over all of the Plateau de Lannemezan with a  radius. Since late 2007, Radio Festival only works with volunteers (a dozen) and is financed by advertising, a few community grants, benefit evenings and activities, and the membership fees and donations. The objective is the promotion of the territory and the people who live there (companies, traders, elected representatives, associations, population). It has an obligation to issue at least four hours of programming on Lannemezan and the Plateau every day, through information flashes, meetings, and direct. It operates 24 hours a day. The station can be listened to, from across the world, through the website: radiofestival-lannemezan.fr.

A public computer space has been created in Lannemezan, first located at Rue Alsace-Lorraine, it was transferred to the Espace Paul Bert to allow more computers to be available, all for free.

DTT has been available at Lannemezan since its inception, thanks to the transmitter of the Pic du Midi de Bigorre. Internet ADSL broadband is available in the commune, and a fibre optic project is underway which is away from the autoroute.

Worship
Catholic worship can be practiced in the commune, two places of worship are present: The Chapel of Bourtoulets and the Church of Saint John the Baptist.

Economy

Employment

The unemployment rate in Lannemezan was 16.3% of the active population (between 15 and 64 years old) in 2017, which is higher than the national average (13.9%). The activity rate of people between 15 and 64 years old was lower in Lannemezan (63.4%) than the national average (74.0%). The employment by sector of activity is shown in the table below:

Income of the population and taxation
The average income per household in Lannemezan amounts to €17,312 per year (statistics based on 2007 revenues). Departmental average: €18,506, national average: €21,930. Lannemezan ranks as 237th commune of the 465 communes classified in the department. By comparison, the following departmental statistics are available:

Industry
The Zone industrielle de Peyrehitte and the Zone Industrielle Sud consist of various industries:

Knauf Insulation: Thermal and acoustic insulation (conversion of the former Alcan site, opened in 2009–2010).
Arkema: Fine chemicals, manufacture of hydrazine hydrate (the only one in France) and derivatives.
PSI: Environment, waste management, transportation and rental.
Carbone Savoie: Manufacture of carbon cathodes and graphite.
Neltec: Manufacture of prepregs and laminates for the manufacturing of microwave printed circuit boards.
Frans Bonhomme: Pipeline, sanitation, public works.
F-Tech: Aerostructures, in collaboration with Daher-Socata (Tarbes).
Socorem: Electricity, automation and air conditioning.
FlexiLoc: Construction equipment, rental equipment and sales.
ESL (energy services Lannemezan): Local public distributor of the electricity, gas and water supplies and street lighting maintenance.
Prugent SAS: Arrangement of high-end boutiques.
Taboada (outside ZI Peyrehitte): Public works.

Agriculture
Lannemezan presents an important rural area, on which is practiced mixed farming:

Polyculture with cereal crops and pastures.
Bovine, porcine, ovine and equine farms (heavy horses).
Presence of an agricultural cooperative and a slaughterhouse.

Many events in connection with these agricultural activities are held throughout the year in the town:

Ash Wednesday in February
The regional sheep competition in March
The Regional Fair of August
The Fair of Saint Catherine in December

Commerce
The Peyrehitte Commercial Zone grown since 2006 at the south of the town.
The Peyrehicade Commercial Zone at the west entrance of the city, on the communes of Capvern and Campistrous.

Tourism
Lannemezan is located at a crossroads between sea and mountains, and thus represents a place of inescapable passage. The commune has four hotels, which have a capacity of 104 rooms (67 classified as 2-star, 37 classified as 1-star).

A construction project in the Peyrehitte Industrial Zone should've led to the opening of a hotel in 2009.

Local culture and heritage

Religious heritage

The Saint-Jean-Baptiste Church is a Gothic church with an extended Romanesque nave (19th century), apse (15th century), portal (13th century), recorded capitals, and an unfinished bell tower (19th century). This building was included in the inventory of historical monuments on 24 October 1945, the two candlesticks of Easter were classified in the inventory of historical monuments on 26 April 1976 and the altarpiece as well as the tabernacle of the high altar were classified on 7 July 1995.

The chapel of the Bourtoulets.

The wood of the Culassou houses a statue of the Virgin Mary.

Civil heritage

Public spaces

Lannemezan has numerous tree-lined squares. The Place de l'hotel de ville [Town Hall Square] is, with its fountain, more modest. A monumental post office overlooking the Place de la République and its war memorial. The tourist office runs along a pathway leading to a large bandstand on the Place des Droits de l'Homme et du Citoyen [Square of the rights of man and of the citizen]. The Place du Château has a large car parking area near the still active market. The market of the Place de la Volaille was transformed into a tea room.

The town has the distinction of counting several war memorials one of which, work of the Russian Bernarovitch Feinberg, was the unfortunate gift from Rothschild in 1921. It struck the local pride and a new monument to relegate it was erected in 1925, shortly after the political defeat of the baron. It was the work of the sculptor of the Druidess, Paul Ducuing.

Remarkable houses
Founder in 1873 the l'Abeille journal published in Tarbes every Sunday. He died at Château Barbé in 1893.

Archaeological remains
The T1 and T2 tumuli located at a place called Puzo Pelat, property of the commune, dating from the Iron Age and the Bronze Age. This archaeological site was inscribed as an historic monument on 6 January 1971.

Environmental and floral heritage
The most floral town of the department, for six consecutive years (classification of the General Council for the cities of the plain of more than 5,000 inhabitants), Lannemezan has many green spaces present in the city: especially square of the Paul Baratgin school and the wood of the resistance fighters (or Wood of the Plantade).
The Demi-Lune leisure park consists of  bordered by forests with flowing canals derived from the Gers with the Pic du Midi de Bigorre visible in the distance. The park consists of a large central lake, many games (mini golf, pedal boats, etc.), vast green spaces inhabited by several species of exotic animals, as well as numerous statues and figurines which tell the tales of Perrault. This park attracts over 150,000 visitors each year.
The family gardens were inaugurated in 2010, near the prison on the Rue des Saligues.

In the vicinity
Natural heritage: Caves (Caves of Gargas) and natural environments (Vallée d'Aure).
Religious and historical heritage: Château de Mauvezin, Escaladieu Abbey, Saint-Bertrand-de-Comminges, and its Cathedral of Notre-Dame.
Winter tourism: Cross-country and Alpine ski resorts (Saint-Lary-Pla d'Adet, Peyragudes, Val-Louron).

Personalities linked to the commune
Anglèse de Sagazan (died 1582) – a French shepherdess
 (b. 1924) – Rugby union player, born in Lannemezan.
Philippe Rougé-Thomas (b. 1961) – Rugby union player, born in Lannemezan.
Pierre Berbizier (b. 1958) – Rugby union player formed in Lannemezan, former coach of the France team, of Italy, of the RC Narbonne and current coach of Racing Metro.
 (b. 1941) – Rugby union international.
Paul-Henri de Le Rue (b. 1984) – snowboarder, the 2006 Turin Olympic bronze medalist, born in Lannemezan.
Marie-Laure Brunet (b. 1988) – biathlete, Medal of bronze at the Vancouver Olympics in 2010, born in Lannemezan.
Solène Jambaqué (b. 1988) – skier, quadruple medalist (2 gold medals, 1 silver and 1 bronze) at the Turin Paralympic Games in 2006 and double silver medallist at the Paralympic Games in Vancouver in 2010, attended the Lycée Michelet of Lannemezan in the skiing section.
 (b. 1930) – architect, Grand Prix of Architecture born in Lannemezan
Jean-Paul Abadie (b. 1958) – French chef and designated Cook of the year in 2004 by the Gault and Millau, he runs the restaurant l'Amphitryon in Lorient for which he was awarded two stars in the Michelin Guide in 2002.
Antoine Dupont (b. 1996) – Rugby union player international at number 9.

Heraldry, logo and motto

See also
Communes of the Hautes-Pyrénées department

Bibliography

References

External links

Official site

Communes of Hautes-Pyrénées